Marmaton is an unincorporated community in Bourbon County, Kansas, United States.  The community is located three miles east of Redfield, and two miles south of U.S. Route 54, at the intersection of 155th Street and Limestone Road.

History
Marmaton was incorporated in 1858.  It was named for the Marmaton River, which crosses the township. Marmaton is a corruption of Marmiton, a French name given by fur traders meaning "scullion".

The mailing address for residents of Marmaton is Fort Scott, Kansas.

Geography
The community is located three miles east of Redfield, and two miles south of U.S. Route 54, at the intersection of 155th Street and Limestone Road.

References

Further reading

External links
 Bourbon County maps: Current, Historic - KDOT

Unincorporated communities in Bourbon County, Kansas
Unincorporated communities in Kansas